Bryant Lamonica Stith (born December 10, 1970) is an American former professional basketball player who played in the National Basketball Association (NBA).  He is currently a men's assistant basketball coach at University of North Carolina Greensboro.

Playing career

College career
Stith was the Atlantic Coast Conference Men's Basketball Rookie of the Year in 1989.  He finished his career in 1992 as Virginia’s all-time leading scorer with 2,516 points.   Stith earned first-team All-ACC honors three times and was named the Most Valuable Player of the 1992 National Invitation Tournament. During Stith's time at Virginia, the Cavaliers compiled four 20-win seasons, three NCAA appearances and the 1992 National Invitation Tournament championship.

Professional career
A 6'5" (1.96 m) shooting guard, Stith was selected from the University of Virginia with the 13th overall pick by the Denver Nuggets in the 1992 NBA draft. Stith played only 39 games in his rookie season, but would play (and start) all 82 games next season (1993–94) averaging 12.5 points per game. Stith later on struggled with injures in his career with the Nuggets. Stith played eight seasons with the team before being traded to the Boston Celtics. He was also traded to the Cleveland Cavaliers and to the Los Angeles Clippers along with Andre Miller for Darius Miles. He retired before ever playing for the Clippers.

International career
He played for the US national team in the 1990 FIBA World Championship, winning the bronze medal.

Coaching career
After the close of his NBA career, Stith became the head coach of the Brunswick (VA) High School Bulldogs. The team won state championships in 2011, 2012, and 2013.

In 2013, Stith was hired as an assistant at Old Dominion University to work under his former Virginia head coach Jeff Jones.

In 2022, he moved from Old Dominion to Mike Jones's coaching staff at UNC Greensboro.

Personal
Stith's sons, Brandan and B. J., committed to play basketball at East Carolina University in 2013 and the University of Virginia in 2014, respectively. After one year at East Carolina, Brandan transferred to Old Dominion to play for his father who is ODU's assistant coach.

B. J. played one year at the Virginia before also transferring to Old Dominion University to play for his father, and with his brother. He sat out the 2015–16 season and played three years for the Monarchs.

Since retiring from the NBA, Stith has been involved in NASCAR, in which he owns a team with race car driver and fellow Emporia native, Hermie Sadler.

In 2007, he was inducted into the Virginia Sports Hall of Fame.

References

External links
 NBA.com profile
 

1970 births
Living people
American men's basketball coaches
American men's basketball players
Basketball coaches from Virginia
Basketball players from Virginia
Boston Celtics players
Cleveland Cavaliers players
Denver Nuggets draft picks
Denver Nuggets players
Goodwill Games medalists in basketball
High school basketball coaches in the United States
NASCAR team owners
Old Dominion Monarchs men's basketball coaches
Parade High School All-Americans (boys' basketball)
People from Emporia, Virginia
Shooting guards
United States men's national basketball team players
Virginia Cavaliers men's basketball players
1990 FIBA World Championship players
Competitors at the 1990 Goodwill Games